Vauxhall is a district in the London Borough of Lambeth. it may also refer to:

Settlements
 Vauxhall, Auckland, a suburb on the North Shore of Auckland, New Zealand
 Vauxhall, Alberta, a town in Alberta, Canada
 Vauxhall, Birmingham, an area of Birmingham, England
 Vauxhall, Liverpool, an inner city area of Liverpool, England
 Vauxhall, Great Yarmouth, a holiday park in Great Yarmouth, England
 Vauxhall, New Jersey
 Vauxhall, Otago, a suburb of Dunedin, New Zealand

Places
 Vauxhall station, a National Rail and London Underground station serving that district
 Vauxhall Gardens, an 18th-century London pleasure garden
 New York Vauxhall Gardens, an 18th-century pleasure garden in New York City
 Vauxhall, Brussels, an 18th-century concert hall in Brussels, Belgium
 Vauxhall (Gothenburg), an 18th-century Gothenburg pleasure garden

Other
 Vauxhall (UK Parliament constituency).
 Vauxhall Motors a British car company
 Vauxhall Motors F.C., an English football club
 Vauxhall and I, a 1994 album by the British singer Morrissey